Aboumedan El Sayed (born 29 October 1977) is an Egyptian judoka.

Achievements

References

1977 births
Living people
Egyptian male judoka
Judoka at the 2004 Summer Olympics
Olympic judoka of Egypt
Mediterranean Games bronze medalists for Egypt
Mediterranean Games medalists in judo
Competitors at the 2001 Mediterranean Games
20th-century Egyptian people
21st-century Egyptian people
African Games medalists in judo
Competitors at the 2003 All-Africa Games
African Games bronze medalists for Egypt